The 2022 Illinois gubernatorial election took place on November 8, 2022, to elect the governor of Illinois, concurrently with the 2022 Illinois general election. Gubernatorial candidates ran on tickets with candidates for lieutenant governor. The incumbent governor and lieutenant governor, first-term Democrats J. B. Pritzker and Juliana Stratton, sought re-election together against Republican nominees Illinois State Senator Darren Bailey and his running mate Stephanie Trussell.

In the general election, Pritzker won re-election with 54.9% of the vote, 0.4% better than he won in 2018. This was the best raw percentage of the vote received by a Democrat for governor since 1960. The overall margin of victory in 2022 for Pritzker was 12.5% while in 2018 Pritzker won by 15.7%, which is a 3.2% decrease for Pritzker. Pritzker's victory was once again the result of a strong performance in the Chicago metropolitan area—containing a majority of the state's population—winning a lopsided victory in strongly Democratic Cook County, the home of Chicago, as well as winning all but one of the neighboring collar counties. However, Bailey improved upon former Republican governor Bruce Rauner's performance in 2018 by just under 4%, largely due to the absence of a strong third-party conservative candidate that appeared in 2018. Subsequently, Bailey was able to flip the counties of Alexander, Fulton, Jackson, Knox, and Winnebago which Pritzker previously won, while Pritzker managed to flip McLean county, marking the first time since 1948 that it has voted for a Democrat in a gubernatorial election. 

Pritzker was the first Illinois governor to serve a full term and get reelected for a second since Rod Blagojevich in 2006. If Pritzker serves the entirety of his term, he would become the first Democratic governor in the state's history to serve two full four-year terms, as every other Democratic governor had either been impeached, died or resigned before finishing their second term.

Election information
The primaries and general elections will coincide with those for federal congressional races, the state's U.S. Senate race, and those for other state offices. The election will be part of the 2022 Illinois elections.

The primary election was held on June 28. The general election was held on November 8, 2022.

Democratic primary

Candidates

Nominee 
 J. B. Pritzker, incumbent governor
Running mate: Juliana Stratton, incumbent lieutenant governor

Eliminated in primary 
Beverly Miles, U.S. Army veteran, registered nurse and activist
Running mate: Karla Shaw

Endorsements

Results

Republican primary

Candidates

Nominee 
 Darren Bailey, state senator
 Running mate: Stephanie Trussell, former radio talk show host from Lisle, Illinois.

Eliminated in primary 
Richard Irvin, mayor of Aurora
Running mate: Avery Bourne, state representative
Gary Rabine, businessman
Running mate: Aaron Del Mar, Palatine Township Republican Committeeman
Paul Schimpf, former state senator and nominee for Attorney General in 2014
Running mate: Carolyn Schofield, McHenry County Board member
Max Solomon, Attorney
Running Mate: Latasha Fields
Jesse Sullivan, venture capitalist
Running mate: Kathleen Murphy, former director of communications for state representative Jeanne Ives

Removed from ballot 
 Emily Johnson
 Keisha Smith

Declined
Kirk Dillard, chair of the Regional Transportation Authority, former state senator, and candidate for governor in 2010 and 2014
Adam Kinzinger, U.S. Representative for 
Todd Ricketts, finance chair of the Republican National Committee, member of the TD Ameritrade Board of Directors, and co-owner of the Chicago Cubs

Endorsements

Polling
Graphical summary

Results

Libertarian convention

Candidates

Nominee
 Scott Schluter, veteran, diesel technician, and chair of the Southern Illinois Libertarian Party
Running mate: John Phillips

Withdrew
Jon Stewart, former professional wrestler and candidate in 2018

Other parties and independents

Independents

Declared but never filed
 Mancow Muller, radio personality

Removed from ballot
 Tommy Belg

General election

Predictions

Endorsements

Polling
Aggregate polls

Graphical summary

J. B. Pritzker vs. Richard Irvin

J. B. Pritzker vs. Gary Rabine

J. B. Pritzker vs. Paul Schimpf

J. B. Pritzker vs. Jesse Sullivan

J. B. Pritzker vs. generic Republican

J. B. Pritzker vs. generic opponent

Generic Democrat vs. generic Republican

Debates

Results

Notes

Partisan clients

References

External links 
Official campaign websites
 Darren Bailey (R) for Governor
 J. B. Pritzker (D) for Governor
 Scott Schluter (L) for Governor

2022
Illinois
Gubernatorial